China Tower Corporation Limited, China Tower in short form, is a state-owned telecommunication company in providing telecommunication tower construction, tower maintenance, ancillary facilities management, and other services through Mainland China.

China Tower was established in July 2014 by merging the telecom tower businesses among China's three telecom giants - China Mobile, China Unicom and China Telecom, which are customers and shareholders of China Tower.

It was listed on Hong Kong Stock Exchange on 8 August 2018 at a price of HK$1.26 per share which raised US$6.9 billion.

References

External links
China Tower Corporation Limited

Government-owned companies of China
Companies listed on the Hong Kong Stock Exchange
Telecommunications companies of China
Telecommunications companies established in 2014
2018 initial public offerings
Companies based in Beijing